Ebel is a Swiss luxury watch company that was founded in 1911 at La Chaux-de-Fonds in the canton of Neuchâtel, Switzerland.

History
Ebel was established in 1911 by Eugène Blum and his wife, Alice (née Lévy). The brand name originates from the first letters of their names: Eugène Blum Et Lévy. According to the company catalogue of 2008, Eugène was responsible for the technical elements and Alice for aesthetics and design. Little is known about her public identity as an artist and entrepreneur, nor about her private life in the family and in the Jewish community. The prize certificate for a patented ring watch in 1914 demonstrates the societal restrictions and lack of recognition for women at the time, being issued to “Messieurs Blum & Cie, Fabrique Ebel La Chaux-de-Fonds” (Gentlemen Blum & Co.).

In 1929, their son Charles took over the management of the company. He built the sales network of the business by further expanding it into many foreign countries, including the United States. Under the direction of Blum's grandson Pierre-Alain, the company took a significant upturn since the beginning of the 1970s and produced wristwatches for Cartier. The company was part of LVMH Group until the end of the 2003. 
 

Towards the end of 2003,  LVMH sold Ebel to Movado Group for $62.2 million.

The "Architects of Time"
Ebel has long sponsored the work of famous architects such as Le Corbusier (who was born in La Chaux-de-Fonds), Andree Putman, or — in the early 1990s — contemporary Swiss painters, such as Jean Arcelin. 
In 1986, the Villa Turque, an early masterpiece of Le Corbusier, was acquired by the group for its 75th anniversary.

In 2019, a gold-and-diamond wristwatch fabricated in 1974 and gifted from the singer Elvis Presley to J.D. Sumner was put up for sale at M.S. Rau Antiques in New Orleans with an estimate of US$498,000. It is crafted in 18 kt gold and features 26 round white diamonds framing the clock face. A personal inscription reads, "From Elvis to J.D. Sumner 1974".

References

External links

Companies based in the canton of Neuchâtel
Design companies established in 1911
Watch manufacturing companies of Switzerland
Manufacturing companies established in 1911
Swiss companies established in 1911